Viens (Occitan: Viènç) is a commune in the Vaucluse department in the Provence-Alpes-Côte d'Azur region in southeastern France.

Geography
The river Calavon forms most of the commune's south-eastern border.

Landmarks
Chateau d'Autet

See also
Communes of the Vaucluse department
Luberon

References

Communes of Vaucluse